Bonhomme Richard, formerly Duc de Duras, was a warship in the American Continental Navy named for Founding Father Benjamin Franklin. She was originally an East Indiaman, a merchant ship built in France for the French East India Company in 1765, for service between France and Asia. She was placed at the disposal of John Paul Jones on 4 February 1779, by King Louis XVI of France as a result of a loan to the United States by French shipping magnate Jacques-Donatien Le Ray.

Origin
Bonhomme Richard was originally an East Indiaman named Duc de Duras, a merchant ship built at Lorient according to the plan drawn up by the King's Master Shipwright Antoine Groignard for the French East India Company in 1765. Her design allowed her to be quickly transformed into a man-of-war in case of necessity to support the navy. She made two voyages to China, the first in 1766 and the second in 1769. At her return the French East India Company had been dissolved, and all its installations and ships transferred to the French Navy. As a naval ship she made a voyage to Isle de France (Mauritius) before being sold to private shipowners in 1771. She sailed in private service until she was purchased by King Louis XVI of France in early 1779 and placed under the command of John Paul Jones on 4 February. The size and armament of Duc de Duras made her roughly equivalent to half of a 64-gun ship of the line.

Jones renamed her Bon Homme Richard (usually rendered in more correct French as Bonhomme Richard) in honor of Benjamin Franklin, the American Commissioner at Paris whose Poor Richard's Almanack was published in France under the title  Les Maximes du Bonhomme Richard.

First patrols
Forced to return to port for repair, the squadron sailed again August 14, 1779. It went northwest around the west coast of the British Isles into the North Sea and then down the east coast. The squadron took 16 merchant vessels as prizes.

Battle of Flamborough Head

Bonhomme Richard and Serapis entered a bitter engagement at about 6:00 p.m. The battle continued for the next four hours, costing the lives of nearly half of the American and British crews. British victory seemed inevitable, as the more heavily armed Serapis used its firepower to rake Bonhomme Richard with devastating effect. The commander of Serapis finally called on Jones to surrender. He replied, "Sir, I have not yet begun to fight!" Jones eventually managed to lash the ships together, nullifying his opponent's greater maneuverability and allowing him to take advantage of the larger size and considerably more numerous crew of Bonhomme Richard. An attempt by the Americans to board Serapis was repulsed, as was an attempt by the British to board Bonhomme Richard. Finally, after another of Jones's ships joined the fight, the British captain was forced to surrender at about 10:30 p.m. Bonhomme Richard – shattered, on fire, leaking badly – defied all efforts to save her and sank about 36 hours later at 11:00 a.m. on 25 September 1779. Jones sailed the captured Serapis to the Dutch United Provinces for repairs.

Though Bonhomme Richard sank after the battle, the battle's outcome was one of the factors that convinced the French crown to back the colonies in their fight to become independent of British authority.

Search for the wreck
Bonhomme Richards final resting location was the subject of much speculation. A number of unsuccessful efforts had been conducted to locate the wreck. The quantity of other wrecks in the area and a century of fishing trawler operations had complicated all searches.

A wreck was identified in 1974 off Flamborough Head and in 2001 it was concluded that there was a high possibility that the wreck was that of the Bonhomme Richard. The remains were designated under the Protection of Wrecks Act in 2002. The wreck is a Protected Wreck managed by Historic England.

One season's attempts to locate and retrieve the ship, or some artifacts from her, using USNS Grasp were filmed for the Discovery Channel's Mighty Ships series in 2011. The U.S. Navy's mission was unsuccessful. In 2012, an expedition with the Ocean Technology Foundation and the French Navy located a wreck of interest (called "Target 131") in 70 meters of water. The wreck is mostly buried, but some artifacts are visible on the seabed surface, including an anchor that would fit the dimensions and style of the kedge anchor on the Bonhomme Richard. In 2014, the French Navy and Ocean Technology Foundation mounted an expedition to have the French Navy dive Target 131.  Artifacts discovered by the divers included a deadeye block (part of a sailing ship's rigging), large sections of half-buried planking, and what appeared to be an iron spar hoop, with a few pieces of decomposing wood still encircled in it. No evidence of modern objects has been found on the site.  The Global Foundation for Ocean Exploration (GFOE) has since continued the work of the Ocean Technology Foundation, leading an expedition with the French and U.S. navies in 2016, again aboard the USNS Grasp.  More remote sensing was conducted, and researchers discovered additional objects within the wreck site that were deemed worthy of further investigation.  A 2019 expedition involving GFOE, the French navy, and the U.S. Navy was planned, but was postponed indefinitely due to a disagreement among France and the U.S. about the ultimate ownership of the Bonhomme Richard. The goal of this mission was to prove or disprove Target 131 as being the Bonhomme Richard.

In 2018 remains were found, possibly those of the Bonhomme Richard, in shallow water very close to the coast of Filey, North Yorkshire, England, by the Land and Sea search team Merlin Burrows. However, the location of this wreck does not corroborate with multiple eyewitness accounts from observers on land, who noted that on the morning of 25 September 1779, the Bonhomme Richard disappeared out of sight over the horizon.

See also
 Serapis flag

ReferencesNotesSourcesBibliography'

External links

Search for the Bonhomme Richard - Global Foundation for Ocean Exploration
Detailed Plank on Frame wooden model of the Bonhomme Richard
Search for the Bonhomme Richard—Clive Cussler recounts his elusive search for the Bonhomme Richard.

Ships of the Continental Navy
Maritime incidents in 1779
Shipwrecks in the North Sea
Sailing frigates of the United States Navy
Ships built in France
1766 ships
1779 in England
Protected Wrecks of England
History of Yorkshire
Ships named for Founding Fathers of the United States